Little River is an unincorporated community in Cherokee County, Alabama, United States.

History
The community is likely named for the nearby Little River. A post office was established under the name in 1858.

Notes

Unincorporated communities in Cherokee County, Alabama
Unincorporated communities in Alabama